Richard Nový (born 3 April 1937) is a Czech rower who competed for Czechoslovakia in the 1960 Summer Olympics and in the 1964 Summer Olympics.

He was born in Prague.

In 1960 he was a crew member of the Czechoslovak boat which was eliminated in the semi-finals of the coxed four event.

Four years later he won the bronze medal with the Czechoslovak boat in the eights competition.

External links
 profile

1939 births
Living people
Czech male rowers
Czechoslovak male rowers
Olympic rowers of Czechoslovakia
Rowers at the 1960 Summer Olympics
Rowers at the 1964 Summer Olympics
Olympic bronze medalists for Czechoslovakia
Olympic medalists in rowing
Medalists at the 1964 Summer Olympics
Rowers from Prague
European Rowing Championships medalists